Phantom Gold is a 1938 American Western film directed by Joseph Levering and starring Jack Luden, Beth Marion and Slim Whitaker.

Cast
 Jack Luden as Breezy
 Beth Marion as Mary Davis
 Barry Downing as Buddy Wright
 Slim Whitaker as Rattler 
 Hal Taliaferro as Dan
 Art Davis as Happy
 Jimmy Robinson as Pancake
 Jack Ingram as Henchman Pete
 Buzz Barton as Bart 
 Marin Sais as Mag Smith
 Forrest Taylor as Henry Wright

References

Bibliography
 Pitts, Michael R. Western Movies: A Guide to 5,105 Feature Films. McFarland, 2012.

External links
 

1938 films
1938 Western (genre) films
American Western (genre) films
Films directed by Joseph Levering
American black-and-white films
Columbia Pictures films
1930s English-language films
1930s American films